Han Xinyun and Zhu Lin were the defending champions, but chose not to participate together. Han partnered Vera Zvonareva, but lost in the semifinals to Duan Yingying and Wang Yafan. Zhu played alongside You Xiaodi, but lost in the first round to Prarthana Thombare and Xun Fangying.

Duan and Wang went on to win the title, defeating Naomi Broady and Yanina Wickmayer 7–6(7–5), 6–3 in the final.

Seeds

Draw

Draw

References
Main Draw

Zhengzhou Women's Tennis Open - Doubles